Sydney Robert Turner (17 November 1880 – 1972) was a British philatelist who was added to the Roll of Distinguished Philatelists in 1957.

References

Signatories to the Roll of Distinguished Philatelists
1880 births
1972 deaths
British philatelists